Shipka ("Rosa canina") is a town in central Bulgaria, part of Kazanlak Municipality, Stara Zagora Province. As of 2005, Shipka has a population of 1,398 and the mayor is Stoyan Ivanov.

The town is known for being located near the historic Shipka Pass, the location of several key battles in the Russo-Turkish War of 1877-78. Local sights include the Shipka Memorial (1934) on Stoletov Peak, the Buzludzha Monument, the Russian-style Shipka Memorial Church (1885–1902) and the recently discovered Thracian tomb Golyamata Kosmatka.

The population is overwhelmingly Eastern Orthodox and ethnically Bulgarian, with a notable minority of Karakachans (a Greek-speaking transhumant people of obscure origin).

Shipka Pass

During the Russo-Turkish War, Shipka Pass was the scene of a series of conflicts collectively named the Battle of Shipka Pass.

The Shipka Memorial, a memorial to those who died for the Liberation of Bulgaria during the Battles of Shipka Pass, stands near the pass.

Notable buildings
Shipka Memorial Church

References

External links

 Shipka – The Pass, Monument, Village and Monastery

Towns in Bulgaria
Populated places in Stara Zagora Province